90 Silver Street is a grade II listed building in Silver Street, Enfield, London. It was built in the late 18th century.

See also
58 & 60 Silver Street

References

External links 

Buildings and structures in the London Borough of Enfield
Grade II listed buildings in the London Borough of Enfield
Enfield, London
Georgian architecture in London
Office buildings in London
Grade II listed houses in London